Gwaenysgor is a small village in Flintshire, Wales. Located near Prestatyn in north Wales, it lies at an elevation of 600 feet, 183 metres. There is one pub, the Eagle and Child. The remnants of RAF Prestatyn lie on the hill nearby. (St. Elmo's Summerhouse).

History 
Mentioned in the Domesday Book of 1086 (then referred to as Wenescol), people have lived on this ancient settlement for more than 5000 years.

References

Villages in Flintshire